Ivo Karlović (born 28 February 1979) is a Croatian former professional tennis player. His height of 211 cm (6 ft 11 in) makes him the joint tallest ranked tennis player in history, along with Reilly Opelka. He won eight ATP Tour singles titles between 2007 and 2016. He is a serve-and-volleyer and officially held the record for the fastest serve recorded in professional tennis, measured at 251 km/h (156 mph), before being surpassed unofficially by Samuel Groth in 2012, and officially by John Isner in 2016. In his prime, he was considered one of the best servers on tour, and held the all-time record for career aces with 13,728 (not including Davis Cup) before the record was broken by Isner on July 1 2022. This makes him one of only five players in history to surpass 10,000 aces. His height enabled him to serve with high speed and unique trajectory.

Junior career
Karlović played his first junior match in April 1995 at the age of 16 at a grade 3 tournament in Croatia. He played only eight tournament throughout his junior career (four singles and four doubles). In singles, he defeated a 15-year-old Marat Safin at the 1995 Junior Davis Cup. In doubles, he was known for partnering future world No. 3 Ivan Ljubičić on numerous occasions.

Karlović ended his junior career with no ranking in both singles or doubles. He had an overall win–loss record of 2–5 in singles and 5–3 in doubles.

Professional career

1998–2004: Beginning
Although not turning pro until 2000 at the age of 21, Karlović played his first ITF futures event in June 1998 and made two finals in August 1998 and September 1999, losing both. He played his first Challenger event in December 1999.

Karlović debuted for the Croatian Davis Cup team in 2000 against Ireland, where he won the dead rubber. Karlović appeared in a starting line-up for the first time in 2002 against Argentina in Buenos Aires, but he lost to Juan Ignacio Chela in the second rubber and to Gastón Gaudio in the fifth and decisive rubber. He has posted a 4–2 career record (2–2 in singles) in three ties since 2000.

Karlović caused a major upset at Wimbledon when he beat defending champion Lleyton Hewitt in his first match in a Grand Slam tournament. As of 2015, Karlović remains the only player in Open tennis history, and only the second player after Charlie Pasarell, to defeat the defending Wimbledon men's singles champion in the first round. He finished the 2003 year in the top 100 and as the Croatian No. 3, behind Ivan Ljubičić and Mario Ančić. He also averaged an ATP-best of 17.6 aces per match. He continued his success during the 2004 season, winning at Calabasas, California. He reached the round of sixteen in several tournaments, including Wimbledon.

2005: First ATP final
In 2005, Karlović reached his first ATP final at the Queen's Club Championships, defeating Lleyton Hewitt and Thomas Johansson along the way. In the final he lost to Andy Roddick. There were no breaks of serve in the match. Afterwards, Roddick said Karlović's serve is "probably the biggest weapon in tennis... you don't really get a feel for it unless you are on the other side. It was not fun at times."

At the 2005 US Open, Karlović lost to eventual runner-up Andre Agassi in three tiebreakers. On 19 October 2005, he finally defeated Roddick in the Madrid Masters event. In November 2005, he was a member of the Croatian team that won the Davis Cup. He did not play in the finals, but played in a semifinal dead rubber.

2006: Breaking into the top 50 in singles and doubles
On 26 February 2006, he won his first ATP Doubles Tournament with South African Chris Haggard, beating James Blake and Mardy Fish in the 2006 Regions Morgan Keegan Championships and the Cellular South Cup, Memphis, USA. On 27 February, he reached a career high of No. 47 in doubles and on 8 May he also reached the top 50 in singles.

2007: First ATP title and breaking top 30
Karlović and Roger Federer were the only players who won titles on three different surfaces during the 2007 season.

At age 28, he won his first ATP singles title at the 2007 U.S. Men's Clay Court Championships in Houston, Texas, defeating Mariano Zabaleta in the final. On 29 May 2007 at the French Open, he defeated eighth seed James Blake in the first round. In the next round he lost to Jonas Björkman in five sets.

On 23 June 2007, he won his second title of the year and his career at Nottingham, the last grass tune-up before Wimbledon, defeating seventh seed Stanislas Wawrinka, Gilles Simon, Juan Martín del Potro, second seed Dmitry Tursunov (a match played on indoor hard courts due to torrential rain), and Arnaud Clément. Despite a first-round loss at Wimbledon, he rose to No. 40, making his top-40 debut.

On 14 October 2007, he won his third title of the year by taking the Stockholm Open, defeating former Australian Open champion Thomas Johansson in three sets in the final. Earlier, Karlović had yet again met Frenchman Arnaud Clément in his quarterfinal, the pair having met five times that year alone, including in the final of Nottingham, where Karlović secured his second career title. Karlović edged past his rival after saving a match point in the final-set tiebreak, and then went on to defeat German No. 1 Tommy Haas in the semifinals.

2008: Fourth ATP title and breaking top 15
At the 2008 Australian Open, Karlović entered the men's doubles tournament with  John Isner, making them the tallest doubles pair in history. Despite losing in the first round, Karlović said "It was a lot of fun. We will win together next time."

Karlović defeated world No. 1 Roger Federer in the third round of the Cincinnati Masters on 31 July 2008. This was his first victory in seven matches against Federer. It was this loss which caused Federer to lose his No. 1 ranking to Rafael Nadal. Karlović then advanced to the semifinals where he lost to eventual champion Andy Murray. This was his career-best result in a top-level tournament.

At the US Open, Karlović fell to Sam Querrey in straight sets.

At the 2008 Madrid Masters, he stunned World No. 3 Novak Djokovic in two tie-breaker sets serving 20 aces to seal victory in 1 hour and 42 minutes. However, he lost in the quarterfinals to Frenchman Gilles Simon, being dominated in the tiebreaks.

2009: First Grand Slam quarterfinal

At Wimbledon 2009, he powered through the first two rounds, beating Lukáš Lacko and Steve Darcis. In the next two rounds he needed only one break of serve in the third set to defeat both ninth seed Jo-Wilfried Tsonga and seventh seed Fernando Verdasco, advancing to face Roger Federer in his first quarterfinal at a Grand Slam. The match was a relatively one-sided affair, with Federer winning in straight sets and going on to win the tournament.

In the 2009 Davis Cup semifinals, Karlović was defeated by Radek Štěpánek, despite hitting a record-breaking 78 aces (the record has since been taken by John Isner). The match was one of the longest in the history of the Davis Cup, lasting 5 hours, 59 minutes. There were only three breaks of serve in this match.

Karlović also won his first five-set match in the Davis Cup quarterfinals against the United States, where he came from behind to beat James Blake from two sets down.

2010: Australian Open fourth found, Injury and absence
Karlović met Štěpánek again at the 2010 Australian Open, in another five-set marathon. This time, the 13-seeded Štěpánek lost. In all five-set matches Karlović has played, this was only his second win. He went on to reach a career-best fourth round there, after beating Julien Benneteau (in four sets), and Ivan Ljubičić (also in four sets). After giving a solid performance, he was ousted by the second seed and defending champion Rafael Nadal in that round.

As the second seed at the 2010 Delray Beach International Tennis Championships, he made a runner-up effort, losing to first-time ATP-finalist Ernests Gulbis.

In the 2010 Davis Cup, where Croatia had a first-round clash with Ecuador, Karlović defeated Nicolás Lapentti in five sets. This was his third five-set match win, following his five-set win over Štěpánek at the Australian Open. His five-set record then stood at 3–12.

Karlović was forced to withdraw from 2010 Wimbledon due to a foot injury.

2011–13: Rankings fall and fifth ATP title

February 2011 saw Karlović temporarily exit from the top 200. In 2012, Karlović beat Dudi Sela in the first round of Wimbledon in straight sets, but was knocked out in the second round by Andy Murray. Karlović controversially accused Wimbledon of being biased, as he was pulled up for approximately 11-foot faults.

In 2013, Karlović suffered from viral meningitis, which was not immediately diagnosed. He was unconscious for some time, and when he woke up, he did not know his name or what year it was. After a lengthy recovery, he was able to play again in Newport in July, where he made it to the quarterfinals, before being defeated by John Isner in one of their typical ace-fests.

In Bogota, also in July, he won his fifth ATP title, beating Alejandro Falla in the final. He did not qualify for the Rogers Cup or Cincinnati Masters.

At the US Open, he made it through qualifying and into the second round by defeating James Blake in the last singles match of his career in five sets. In the second round, he met Stanislas Wawrinka, to whom he lost in straight sets.

2014: Four ATP finals and return to top 30
In February, Karlović reached the final of the U.S. National Indoor Tennis Championships, losing to Kei Nishikori. In May, he reached the final of the Düsseldorf Open, losing to Philipp Kohlschreiber. In July, he reached the final of the Hall of Fame Open, losing an epic match to Lleyton Hewitt. Another solid week of tennis saw him make back-to-back finals, this time at the Claro Open Colombia, losing to Bernard Tomic in a tight three-setter. He avenged that loss the following month at the Rogers Cup in another tight three-setter.

2015: Sixth ATP title and return to top 20
Karlović won his sixth title, defeating Donald Young at the Delray Beach Open. He also won the 2015 Topshelf Open in doubles with Łukasz Kubot. He reached his second Hall of Fame Open final, which he lost to Rajeev Ram in three sets.

2016: Seventh & eight titles as oldest champion since 1979, return to top 20

Karlović suffered a knee injury and missed two months of play.

He reached the final of the Hall of Fame Open for the third time against Gilles Müller, which he won in three tiebreaks. At the age of 37 and 5 months, he became the oldest player to win an ATP title since 1979. He reached an ATP World Tour 500 series tournament at the Washington Open (tennis), which he lost to Gaël Monfils.

He then won the Los Cabos Open, beating Feliciano López in straight sets and returned to the top 20 again at 37 years and 6 months.

2017: 75 Aces at Australian Open
Karlović began the Australian Open by defeating Horacio Zeballos in a 5-hour, 15-minute match, the second-longest match at the tournament in the Open Era (behind the Djokovic–Nadal final in 2012). He set an Australian Open record, hitting 75 aces.

Aged 38, Karlović set up the oldest ATP Tour tournament final in 41 years against Gilles Muller, aged 34, at the 2017 Ricoh Open. He lost in straight sets.

2018: Defying age
At the Australian Open, Karlović progressed to the Round of 32, losing to Andreas Seppi, 7–9 in the fifth set.

At the Ecuador Open in Quito, Karlović made it to the Round of 16, losing to 18 years old Corentin Moutet in a third-set tie-break.

Next, he reached the quarterfinals at New York Open losing to second seed Sam Querrey.

After a string of tight first round losses at Delray Beach Open, Indian Wells Masters and Miami Open (tennis), the U.S. Men's Clay Court Championships in Houston saw Karlović reach the semifinals with wins over Japanese Taro Daniel, Denis Kudla and 4th seed Nick Kyrgios. In the semifinals, he lost to eventual runner-up Tennys Sandgren in two close tie-break sets.

At Wimbledon, he reached the second round. At the US Open, he was defeated in the second round of qualifying.

In October, he became the oldest champion of an ATP Challenger tournament, winning the Calgary Challenger at 39 years and seven months.

2019: Oldest ATP finalist since 1977 
At the Maharashtra Open Karlović beat teenager Félix Auger-Aliassime in first round. The age gap of 21 years and 6 months between the two players was the largest on the ATP Tour since 2011. Karlović and Auger-Aliassime were the oldest and the youngest players in the Top 200 ATP rankings at the beginning of the 2019 season. He went on to make the final, at 39 years and 10 months becoming the oldest finalist on the ATP Tour since 43-year-old Ken Rosewall won the 1977 Hong Kong championship.

With his victory over Matthew Ebden at the Indian Wells Masters, he became the first player aged over 40 to win an ATP Tour match since Jimmy Connors in 1995 in Halle. In addition, he is the oldest to win a match in ATP Masters 1000 history.

2021: 63rd Grand Slam appearance, retirement 
At the 2021 Hall of Fame Open in Newport, Karlovic won against 24-year-old Bernabé Zapata Miralles. This was only his second match win for 2021, the first being at the 2021 Delray Beach Open against Pablo Andújar. At 42 years old, Karlovic was the oldest player to compete in an ATP Tour match since Thomas Muster, 44, in 2011 in Vienna (l. to Dominic Thiem in R1).

In July, Los Cabos Open organisers circulated news of Karlović's retirement at the 2021 US Open. Later, he said he may change his mind and continue playing in 2022 if he got good results.

Karlović entered the US Open qualifying draw for possibly his last tournament. He won all three of his qualifying matches to qualify for the US Open, making him the second-oldest Grand Slam qualifier in the Open Era after Mal Anderson qualified for the 1977 Australian Open. It was his 17th Grand Slam draw participation at the US Open and the 63rd overall Grand Slam main draw appearance for the 42-year-old. He lost in the first round to 5th seed Andrey Rublev in straight sets.

National representation
Karlović has been absent from some previous Croatian Davis Cup campaigns owing to his dispute with the Croatian Tennis Association. He further strained his relations with the Croatian Tennis Association and the Croatian Olympic Committee by his last-minute withdrawal from the Olympic tournament in Beijing, communicated via an SMS message.

He played against Japan in the first round in 2012 in Japan with wins over Kei Nishikori and Go Soeda in singles and in doubles winning with Dodig.

In 2016, he accepted an invitation to the Davis Cup final against Argentina. He played the second match, losing against Juan Martín del Potro, and had to play the last deciding match, again losing against Federico Delbonis.

Performance timelines

Singles
{|class="wikitable nowrap" style=text-align:center;font-size:84%
!Tournament!!2000!!2001!!2002!!2003!!2004!!2005!!2006!!2007!!2008!!2009!!2010!!2011!!2012!!2013!!2014!!2015!!2016!!2017!!2018!!2019!!2020!!2021!!SR!!W–L!!Win%
|-
| colspan="26" align="left" |Grand Slam tournaments
|-
|align=left|Australian Open
|A
|bgcolor=ecf2ff|Q3
|bgcolor=ecf2ff|Q2
|A
|bgcolor=afeeee|2R
|bgcolor=afeeee|1R
|bgcolor=afeeee|1R
|bgcolor=afeeee|1R
|bgcolor=afeeee|3R
|bgcolor=afeeee|2R
|bgcolor=afeeee|4R
|bgcolor=afeeee|1R
|bgcolor=afeeee|3R
|bgcolor=afeeee|1R
|bgcolor=afeeee|1R
|bgcolor=afeeee|2R
|bgcolor=afeeee|1R
|bgcolor=afeeee|3R
|bgcolor=afeeee|3R
|bgcolor=afeeee|2R
|bgcolor=afeeee|2R
|A
|0 / 17
|16–17
|48%
|-
|align=left|French Open
|A
|A
|bgcolor=ecf2ff|Q1
|bgcolor=ecf2ff|Q2
|bgcolor=afeeee|1R
|bgcolor=afeeee|1R
|bgcolor=afeeee|2R
|bgcolor=afeeee|2R
|bgcolor=afeeee|1R
|bgcolor=afeeee|1R
|A
|bgcolor=afeeee|1R
|bgcolor=afeeee|1R
|A
|bgcolor=afeeee|3R
|bgcolor=afeeee|1R
|bgcolor=afeeee|3R
|bgcolor=afeeee|2R
|bgcolor=afeeee|1R
|bgcolor=afeeee|2R
|bgcolor=ecf2ff|Q2
|A
|0 / 14
|8–14
|36%
|-
|align=left|Wimbledon
|bgcolor=ecf2ff|Q3
|bgcolor=ecf2ff|Q2
|bgcolor=ecf2ff|Q1
|bgcolor=afeeee|3R
|bgcolor=afeeee|4R
|bgcolor=afeeee|1R
|bgcolor=afeeee|1R
|bgcolor=afeeee|1R
|bgcolor=afeeee|1R
|bgcolor=ffebcd|QF
|A
|bgcolor=afeeee|2R
|bgcolor=afeeee|2R
|A
|bgcolor=afeeee|1R
|bgcolor=afeeee|4R
|bgcolor=afeeee|2R
|bgcolor=afeeee|1R
|bgcolor=afeeee|2R
|bgcolor=afeeee|2R
|style=color:#767676|NH
|bgcolor=ecf2ff|Q1
|0 / 15
|17–15
|53%
|-
|align=left|US Open
|bgcolor=ecf2ff|Q1
|bgcolor=ecf2ff|Q2
|bgcolor=ecf2ff|Q1
|bgcolor=afeeee|3R
|bgcolor=afeeee|1R
|bgcolor=afeeee|2R
|bgcolor=afeeee|1R
|bgcolor=afeeee|1R
|bgcolor=afeeee|3R
|bgcolor=afeeee|1R
|A
|bgcolor=afeeee|3R
|bgcolor=afeeee|1R
|bgcolor=afeeee|2R
|bgcolor=afeeee|2R
|bgcolor=afeeee|2R
|bgcolor=afeeee|4R
|bgcolor=afeeee|1R
|bgcolor=ecf2ff|Q2
|bgcolor=afeeee|1R
|bgcolor=afeeee|1R
|bgcolor=afeeee|1R
|0 / 17
|13–17
|43%
|-style=font-weight:bold;background:#efefef
|style=text-align:left|Win–loss
|0–0
|0–0
|0–0
|4–2
|4–4
|1–4
|1–4
|1–4
|4–4
|5–4
|3–1
|3–4
|3–4
|1–2
|3–4
|5–4
|6–4
|3–4
|3–3
|3–4
|1–2
|0–1
|0 / 63
|54–63
|46%
|-
| colspan="26" align="left" |National representation
|-
|align=left|Summer Olympics
|A
|colspan=3 style=color:#767676|not held
|bgcolor=afeeee|3R
|colspan=3 style=color:#767676|not held
|A
|colspan=3 style=color:#767676|not held
|A
|colspan=3 style=color:#767676|not held
|A
|colspan=4 style=color:#767676|not held
|A
|0 / 1
|2–1
|67%
|-
|align=left|Davis Cup
|bgcolor=ecf2ff|Z2
|A
|bgcolor=ffebcd|QF
|A
|bgcolor=afeeee|1R
|bgcolor=lime|W
|A
|A
|bgcolor=ecf2ff|PO
|bgcolor=yellow|SF
|bgcolor=ffebcd|QF
|bgcolor=afeeee|1R
|bgcolor=ffebcd|QF
|A
|A
|A
|bgcolor=thistle|F
|A
|A
|A
|A
|A
|1 / 8
|9–10
|47%
|-
| colspan="26" align="left" |ATP Tour Masters 1000
|-
|align=left|Indian Wells Masters
|A
|A
|A
|A
|bgcolor=afeeee|1R
|bgcolor=afeeee|2R
|bgcolor=afeeee|2R
|bgcolor=ecf2ff|Q1
|bgcolor=afeeee|3R
|bgcolor=afeeee|3R
|bgcolor=afeeee|2R
|bgcolor=ffebcd|QF
|bgcolor=afeeee|1R
|bgcolor=afeeee|2R
|bgcolor=afeeee|2R
|bgcolor=afeeee|2R
|A
|bgcolor=afeeee|2R
|bgcolor=afeeee|1R
|bgcolor=afeeee|4R
|style=color:#767676|NH
|bgcolor=ecf2ff|Q2
|0 / 14
|13–14
|48%
|-
|align=left|Miami Open
|A
|A
|A
|A
|bgcolor=afeeee|1R
|bgcolor=afeeee|1R
|bgcolor=afeeee|1R
|bgcolor=afeeee|1R
|bgcolor=afeeee|2R
|bgcolor=afeeee|2R
|bgcolor=afeeee|3R
|bgcolor=afeeee|1R
|bgcolor=afeeee|2R
|bgcolor=ecf2ff|Q1
|bgcolor=afeeee|2R
|bgcolor=afeeee|2R
|A
|bgcolor=afeeee|3R
|bgcolor=afeeee|1R
|bgcolor=afeeee|1R
|style=color:#767676|NH
|bgcolor=ecf2ff|Q2
|0 / 14
|4–14
|22%
|-
|align=left|Monte-Carlo Masters
|A
|A
|A
|A
|A
|bgcolor=afeeee|1R
|bgcolor=afeeee|1R
|A
|bgcolor=afeeee|2R
|bgcolor=afeeee|2R
|A
|A
|A
|A
|bgcolor=afeeee|1R
|A
|bgcolor=afeeee|1R
|A
|A
|A
|style=color:#767676|NH
|A
|0 / 6
|2–6
|25%
|-
|align=left|Madrid Open
|colspan=2 style=color:#767676|not held
|A
|A
|bgcolor=afeeee|1R
|bgcolor=ffebcd|QF
|A
|bgcolor=afeeee|3R
|bgcolor=ffebcd|QF
|bgcolor=afeeee|2R
|bgcolor=afeeee|2R
|bgcolor=afeeee|1R
|bgcolor=afeeee|1R
|A
|A
|bgcolor=afeeee|1R
|bgcolor=afeeee|1R
|bgcolor=afeeee|2R
|A
|A
|style=color:#767676|NH
|A
|0 / 11
|10–11
|48%
|-
|align=left|Italian Open
|A
|A
|A
|A
|bgcolor=afeeee|3R
|bgcolor=ecf2ff|Q1
|A
|bgcolor=ecf2ff|Q2
|bgcolor=afeeee|3R
|bgcolor=afeeee|2R
|A
|bgcolor=afeeee|1R
|bgcolor=ecf2ff|Q2
|A
|bgcolor=afeeee|2R
|A
|bgcolor=afeeee|1R
|A
|A
|A
|A
|A
|0 / 6
|6–6
|50%
|-
|align=left|Canadian Open
|A
|A
|bgcolor=ecf2ff|Q1
|A
|bgcolor=afeeee|1R
|bgcolor=afeeee|1R
|A
|bgcolor=afeeee|2R
|A
|bgcolor=afeeee|1R
|A
|bgcolor=afeeee|3R
|A
|bgcolor=ecf2ff|Q2
|bgcolor=afeeee|2R
|bgcolor=afeeee|3R
|bgcolor=afeeee|3R
|A
|A
|bgcolor=ecf2ff|Q2
|style=color:#767676|NH
|A
|0 / 8
|8–8
|50%
|-
|align=left|Cincinnati Masters
|A
|A
|A
|A
|bgcolor=afeeee|3R
|bgcolor=ecf2ff|Q1
|A
|bgcolor=afeeee|1R
|bgcolor=yellow|SF
|bgcolor=afeeee|2R
|A
|bgcolor=afeeee|2R
|A
|bgcolor=ecf2ff|Q2
|bgcolor=afeeee|1R
|bgcolor=afeeee|3R
|bgcolor=afeeee|1R
|bgcolor=afeeee|3R
|bgcolor=ecf2ff|Q2
|bgcolor=afeeee|1R
|A
|A
|0 / 10
|12–10
|55%
|-
|align=left|Shanghai Masters
|colspan=9 style=color:#767676|not Masters series
|bgcolor=afeeee|1R
|A
|A
|A
|A
|bgcolor=afeeee|3R
|bgcolor=afeeee|2R
|bgcolor=afeeee|1R
|bgcolor=afeeee|1R
|A
|A
|colspan=2 style=color:#767676|not held
|0 / 5
|3–5
|37%
|-
|align=left|Paris Masters
|A
|bgcolor=ecf2ff|Q1
|A
|bgcolor=ecf2ff|Q1
|bgcolor=ecf2ff|Q1
|A
|A
|bgcolor=afeeee|2R
|bgcolor=afeeee|1R
|bgcolor=afeeee|2R
|A
|A
|A
|bgcolor=ecf2ff|Q1
|bgcolor=afeeee|1R
|bgcolor=afeeee|1R
|bgcolor=afeeee|2R
|A
|A
|A
|A
|A
|0 / 6
|3–6
|33%
|-
|align=left|German Open
|A
|A
|A
|A
|A
|bgcolor=afeeee|1R
|A
|A
|bgcolor=afeeee|3R
|colspan=13 style="color:#767676"|not Masters Series
|0 / 2
|2–2
|50%
|-style=font-weight:bold;background:#efefef
|style=text-align:left|Win–loss
|0–0
|0–0
|0–0
|0–0
|4–6
|4–6
|1–3
|4–5
|12–8
|6–9
|2–3
|7–6
|1–3
|1–1
|6–8
|5–7
|3–7
|4–5
|0–2
|3–3
|0–0
|0–0
|0 / 82
|63–82
|43%
|-
| colspan="26" align="left" |Career statistics
|-
!!!2000!!2001!!2002!!2003!!2004!!2005!!2006!!2007!!2008!!2009!!2010!!2011!!2012!!2013!!2014!!2015!!2016!!2017!!2018!!2019!!2020!!2021!! colspan="3" |Career
|-bgcolor=efefef
|align=left|Tournaments
|0
|1
|2
|7
|25
|22
|18
|24
|26
|22
|9
|20
|16
|14
|28
|26
|24
|20
|16
|15
|4
|4
|colspan=3|343
|-style=font-weight:bold;background:#efefef
|style=text-align:left|Titles
|0
|0
|0
|0
|0
|0
|0
|3
|1
|0
|0
|0
|0
|1
|0
|1
|2
|0
|0
|0
|0
|0
|colspan=3|8
|-style=font-weight:bold;background:#efefef
|style=text-align:left|Finals
|0
|0
|0
|0
|0
|1
|0
|4
|1
|0
|1
|0
|0
|1
|4
|2
|3
|1
|0
|1
|0
|0
|colspan=3|19
|-bgcolor=efefef
|align=left|Hard W–L
|0–0
|0–1
|1–1
|5–4
|6–12
|9–11
|8–11
|29–16
|19–15
|10–15
|15–7
|12–14
|14–11
|13–11
|24–18
|26–18
|20–15
|8–12
|4–7
|9–11
|1–4
|1–3
|4 / 217
|234–217
|52%
|-bgcolor=efefef
|align=left|Clay W–L
|0–0
|0–0
|0–2
|1–1
|5–8
|0–6
|7–5
|5–2
|5–8
|6–6
|2–2
|3–4
|0–4
|0–1
|7–6
|1–3
|4–6
|3–4
|5–6
|1–2
|0–0
|0–0
|1 / 71
|55–76
|42%
|-bgcolor=efefef
|align=left|Grass W–L
|1–0
|0–0
|0–1
|3–2
|5–3
|7–3
|0–2
|8–2
|7–2
|7–2
|0–0
|1–3
|2–2
|2–1
|5–4
|11–4
|8–3
|4–4
|2–3
|1–2
|0–0
|1–1
|3 / 47
|75–44
|63%
|-bgcolor=efefef
|align=left|Carpet W–L
|1–0
|0–0
|0–0
|0–0
|2–3
|1–3
|2–1
|1–1
|0–1
|colspan=13 style="color:#767676"|discontinued
|0 / 8
|7–9
|44%
|-style=font-weight:bold;background:#efefef
|style=text-align:left|Overall win–loss
|2–0
|0–1
|1–4
|9–7
|18–26
|17–23
|17–19
|43–21
|31–26
|23–23
|17–9
|16–21
|16–17
|15–13
|36–28
|38–25
|32–24
|15–20
|11–16
|11–15
|1–4
|2–4
|8 / 343
|371–346
|52%
|-style=font-weight:bold;background:#efefef
|align=left|Win %
|100%
|0%
|20%
|56%
|41%
|43%
|47%
|67%
|54%
|50%
|61%
|43%
|48%
|54%
|56%
|60%
|57%
|43%
|41%
|42%
|20%
|33%
|colspan=3|
|-bgcolor=efefef
|align=left|Year-end ranking
|286
|193
|201
|73
|61
|70
|98
|22
|26
|37
|73
|56
|100
|78
|27
|23
|20
|80
|100
|95
|147
|273
|colspan=3|{{Tooltip|'$10,160,232|Career Prize Money – Singles & Doubles combined}}
|}

Doubles

Style of play
Karlović's plays a very offensive and powerful playing style. His best and most powerful weapon is his serve. His height of 2.11 meters makes his serve very powerful and it is regarded as one of if not the best in tennis history. He has hit 13,762 aces during his career, the second most in all of ATP history.

Besides his huge serve. Karlović also has a powerful forehand which he usually hits deep and fast into his opponent's baseline. On his backhand side, he usually slices the ball deep into his opponent's baseline and rarely uses the one-handed backhand drive that he possesses.

Karlović is also known as a serve-and-volleyer. His serve usually causes players to return the ball lightly, at which point he will come forward on the ball and volley it. His skill at the net is one of the key traits of his playing style.

Serving records

On 18 September 2009, Karlović hit 78 aces (77 aces on 1st serve) in a Davis Cup match against Radek Štěpánek, breaking his previous record of 51 (against Daniele Bracciali in the 2005 Wimbledon Championships) and 55 (against Lleyton Hewitt in the 2009 French Open). Only once in his ATP career has he failed to hit an ace during a match, which was in the 2008 Monte Carlo Masters against Frenchman Gaël Monfils. His record of aces in a single match was broken by both John Isner and Nicolas Mahut in the longest match in tennis history at the first round of the 2010 Wimbledon Championships, where Isner hit 113 aces and Mahut hit 103.

In 2007, Karlović became the fourth player to serve 1,000 aces in a season. He finished the year with 1,318 aces, second all-time behind Goran Ivanišević, who hit 1,477 in 1996. In 2015, he became the third player (after Goran Ivanišević and Andy Roddick) to serve 9,000 career aces., and the second to notch 10,000 aces.

This is the third-fastest first serve on record, after Andy Roddick's . He also hit a  second serve against Paul Capdeville in the quarterfinals of the 2007 Legg Mason Tennis Classic on 3 August, which is the fastest second serve on record.. Retrieved 23 June 2010.Retrieved 23 June 2010.

Karlovic's record of a 156 mph serve was broken by Samuel Groth at the 2012 ATP Challenger in Busan, but was still the record for ATP events until John Isner broke the record in 2016.

On 19 June 2015 Karlović broke the record for most aces in a three-set ATP Tour match during the quarterfinal of 2015 Gerry Weber Open. He served 45 aces in a 7–5, 6–7(8–10), 6–3 win over Tomáš Berdych.

Karlović held the record for the most aces in tennis history after surpassing Goran Ivanišević in October 2015. As of September 2021, he has struck 13,728 aces in 694 matches (not including Davis Cup). This record was surpassed by John Isner in June 2022, who hit his 13,729th ace in a third round match at the 2022 Wimbledon Championships.

Personal life
During Karlović's childhood, his mother Gordana worked in agriculture, while his father Vlado was a meteorologist.

Karlović married his wife Alsi on 29 March 2005. Their first child, Jada Valentina, was born in September 2011.

One of his favorite activities is playing basketball.

Karlović is known for his humorous Twitter account.

Karlović wears European size 51 shoes.

Equipment and apparel
Karlovic currently endorses the Head Graphene Radical Pro, and wears Mizuno clothing.

Early on in his career, Karlović used Head Prestige racquets, until switching to the Head Flexpoint Instinct in 2005. He continued to use the Instinct until 2012, except for a brief switch to the Babolat AeroPro Drive Cortex in 2009.

In 2013, after a period of struggling to find a replacement for the Flexpoint Instinct he enjoyed, he finally switched to the Head YouTek IG Radical Pro, and proceeded to endorse the new Graphene Radical in 2014.

Karlović has previously worn apparel by Diadora, My OCK, Adidas, Nike, Li-Ning, Sergio Tacchini and Mizuno, as well as his own brand 6'10".

ATP career finals

Singles: 19 (8 titles, 11 runner-ups)

Doubles: 3 (2 titles, 1 runner-up)

 ATP Challenger Tour finals 

Singles: 12 (7–5)

Doubles: 3 (0–3)

 ITF futures finals 

 Singles: 8 (4–4) 

 Doubles: 10 (4–6) 

National representation

 Team competition finals 

Davis Cup: 2 (1 title, 1 runner-up)

World Team Cup: 1 (1 title)

 Davis Cup  (13–14) 

   indicates the outcome of the Davis Cup match followed by the score, date, place of event, the zonal classification and its phase, and the court surface.

Wins over top 10 players
He has a  record against players who were, at the time the match was played, ranked in the top 10.

Record against top 10 players
Karlović's record against players who have been ranked world No. 10 or higher, based on ATP head-to-head records.* Statistics correct .''

See also 
Croatia Davis Cup team
Fastest recorded tennis serves

References

External links
 
 
 
 
 

1979 births
Living people
Croatian male tennis players
Olympic tennis players of Croatia
Tennis players from Zagreb
Tennis players at the 2004 Summer Olympics